Sarbottam Dangol (Nepali: सर्वोत्तम डंगोल) (Born on 30 August 1955 in Kathmandu, Nepal), politically known as 'Kailash' is a prominent Nepalese leader of Nepal Communist Party (NCP) and a former central committee member of Communist Party of Nepal (Maoist-Centre). He stood as a candidate for the mayor post of Kathmandu Metropolitan City in May 2017. 
 He also stood for the election in 2008 Nepalese constituent Assembly from Kathmandu area no. 8.

He belongs to Newar community of Nepal.

Personal life, education and early career

Sarbottam Dangol was born on 30 August 1955 to his father Dwarika Dangol (also a Nepalese communist leader, known as "Kisan neta", Nepali: "किसान नेता") and his mother Jambuwati Dangol, as an eighth child in Kathmandu, the capital city of Nepal in a middle-class family. He received a Bachelor of Science and Master of Management from Tribhuvan University, Kathmandu, Nepal. He also worked as a school headmaster till 1985 and worked as a communist political leader of United People's Front of Nepal.

Political career

His active and most important participation in the Nepalese politics was during the late 80s and early 90s, when he worked as a student leader, who threatened the then royal government and resulted in his arrest by the former royal government in May 1985 and was detained for two years without charge or trial, including two months of incommunicado detention. Amnesty International strongly demanded his release to the then royal government after the reports of torture had been revealed. His participation was notably important during the People's movement of anti-monarchy for Republic establishment in 1990 and was imprisoned number of times until the establishment of multi-party democracy in 1990. During the anti-panchayat movement, he was disappeared by the state for 84 days and jailed for over two years.

He joined the Communist Party of Nepal (Maoist-Centre) in 2007, and currently he is a political leader at Nepal Communist Party (NCP), former Central Committee member of Communist Party of Nepal (Maoist-Centre) and former political representative at Kathmandu Metropolitan City.

Gallery

References

1955 births
Living people
Newar people
People from Kathmandu
Tribhuvan University alumni
Nepal Communist Party (NCP) politicians
Communist Party of Nepal (Maoist Centre) politicians
Nepalese atheists
People of the Nepalese Civil War